Noapara is a locality in Baranagar of North 24 Parganas district in the Indian state of West Bengal. It is a part of the area covered by Kolkata Metropolitan Development Authority (KMDA).

Geography

Location
Noapara is located at

Police station
Baranagar police station under Barrackpore Police Commissionerate has jurisdiction over Baranagar Municipal area.

Demographics

Kolkata Urban Agglomeration
The following Municipalities, Census Towns and other locations in Barrackpore subdivision were part of Kolkata Urban Agglomeration in the 2011 census: Kanchrapara (M), Jetia (CT), Halisahar (M), Balibhara (CT), Naihati (M), Bhatpara (M), Kaugachhi (CT), Garshyamnagar (CT), Garulia (M), Ichhapur Defence Estate (CT), North Barrackpur (M), Barrackpur Cantonment (CB), Barrackpore (M), Jafarpur (CT), Ruiya (CT), Titagarh (M), Khardaha (M), Bandipur (CT), Panihati (M), Muragachha (CT) New Barrackpore (M), Chandpur (CT), Talbandha (CT), Patulia (CT), Kamarhati (M), Baranagar (M), South Dumdum (M), North Dumdum (M), Dum Dum (M), Noapara (CT), Babanpur (CT), Teghari (CT), Nanna (OG), Chakla (OG), Srotribati (OG) and Panpur (OG).

Transport

Road
A.K. Mukherjee Road is the artery of Noapara. It is also located near to B.T. Road. The bus stop near Noapara on B.T. Road is Tobin Road and many buses pass through here. The only bus (Private bus) that enters into Noapara is 34C (Noapara - Esplanade).

Train
Dum Dum Junction and Dum Dum Cantonment railway station are the nearest railway stations of Noapara.

Metro Rail
Kolkata Metro Line 1 was extended up to Noapara metro station in 2013.

Notable residents
 Tanmoy Bhattacharya

References

External links
 Baranagar Municipality

Cities and towns in North 24 Parganas district
Neighbourhoods in North 24 Parganas district
Neighbourhoods in Kolkata
Kolkata Metropolitan Area
Baranagar